Semigordionus is a genus of worms belonging to the family Chordodidae.

Species:
 Semigordionus circumannulatus Heinze, 1952

References

Nematomorpha